The Polish Socialist Youth Union (ZSMP) is an old youth group based in Warsaw. Founded in 1976 under the communist rule, the ZSMP is a former member of the World Federation of Democratic Youth. Along with the Socialist Youth Union, they formed the youth faction of the Polish United Workers' Party.

External links
ZSMP Main Website 
ZSMP Gdansk 
Hymn of the ZSMP 

Polish United Workers' Party
Youth wings of political parties in Poland
Politics of Poland
Youth organisations based in Poland
Youth wings of communist parties
Socialist organisations in Poland